While Switzerland remained neutral during World War I, three of its citizens served in other nations' air forces and became flying aces.

 Alfred Michael Koch – 10 confirmed aerial victories while serving in the Royal Flying Corps and Royal Air Force.
 Marcel Bloch – 5 confirmed aerial victories while  serving in the French Aéronautique Militaire.
 Jacques Roques – 5 confirmed aerial victories when serving in the French Aéronautique Militaire.

References
Notes

Bibliography
 
 
 

Swiss aviators
Swiss
World War I aces from Switzerland